USS SC-277, sometimes styled as either Submarine Chaser No. 277 or S.C.-277, was an  built for the United States Navy during World War I. Like most members of her class, she was not named and known only by her designation.

SC-277 was laid down at the Mare Island Navy Yard at Mare Island, California; launched on 31 July 1917; and commissioned 9 April 1918. The sub chaser conducted three trials between 11 April and 1 May, and on 3 May departed Mare Island.

While at Ponta Delgada, Azores, SC-277 received a repair party from destroyer tender  on or after 30 April 1918.

On 17 July 1920 SC-277 received, as part of the new U.S. Navy letter-number scheme, the hull designation of PC-277. She returned to Mare Island on 17 October 1920.

SC-277 was decommissioned on 15 June 1922 and sold on 25 September 1922 to M. Levin & Sons of San Francisco, California. Her ultimate fate is unknown.

Notes

References

External links
 

SC-1-class submarine chasers
World War I patrol vessels of the United States
Ships built in Vallejo, California
1917 ships